The National Hockey League (NHL) is a major professional ice hockey league which operates in Canada and the United States. Of these players, a number have been inducted into the Hockey Hall of Fame. From 1961 until being surpassed by Marleau on April 19, 2021, the record for most games played was held by Gordie Howe, who played 1,767 games. A player who reaches the milestone is awarded a silver stick.

Thirty-five of the listed players have played for only one franchise (of which nine are still playing in the current ). Five of those players played exclusively for the Detroit Red Wings and four played for the Montreal Canadiens, those teams having the most such players. The record for most teams played for by a player who has competed in over 1,000 games is held by Mike Sillinger, who played for 12 teams in his career; Sillinger played his 1,000th game with his 12th and final NHL team, the New York Islanders. Patrick Roy, Martin Brodeur and Roberto Luongo are the only goaltenders with at least 1,000 games played. Roy spent his career with the Montreal Canadiens and the Colorado Avalanche while Brodeur, with a goaltender-leading 1,266 games, played for the New Jersey Devils and his final seven games with the St. Louis Blues. Luongo played for the New York Islanders, Florida Panthers and Vancouver Canucks in his career. The first 1,000 game goaltender was Patrick Roy, marked in the 2002–03 season.

Only 21 players have played in over 1,500 games; of those, 14 have been inducted into the Hall of Fame and three more are not yet eligible for induction. Three of those 21 (Nicklas Lidstrom, Alex Delvecchio and Steve Yzerman) played their entire careers with Detroit; Shane Doan, of the Winnipeg/Phoenix/Arizona franchise, is the only player to play over 1,500 games with a single franchise other than Detroit. In addition, eight of the 18 spent at least some portion of their career with the Red Wings, also more than any other team. Lidstrom's 1,564 games is the most for any player in a career spent with only one franchise. The record for most teams played for by a player who has competed in over 1,500 games is held by Jaromir Jagr, who has played for nine teams in his career. Jagr played his 1,500th game with New Jersey, his seventh NHL team.

Due to the much greater number of teams, the greater salaries paid to today's players, and the greater number of games played in a season, the list is dominated by post-expansion players.  No NHL player surpassed 1,000 games before Gordie Howe on November 26, 1961, against the Chicago Black Hawks.  Only 17 players in the top 100 started their careers before the expansion era, and only two players—Red Kelly and Bill Gadsby—played in more than 1,000 games and finished their careers before the expansion era.

Key
This list is updated at the end of the season, except for the list of a player's teams, and if the all-time record is broken.

Note: There have been two different NHL franchises carrying the Winnipeg Jets name: one that played from 1979–96 and that is now the Arizona Coyotes, and one from 2011 onward, formerly the Atlanta Thrashers. Players with the first franchise are marked as having played with Winnipeg (original).

1,500 or more games played

1,250–1,499 games played

1,100–1,249 games played

1,050–1,099 games played

1,000–1,049 games played

1,000th game played during the 2022–23 NHL season

Players with 1,000 games played by franchise

The following is an index of players who have played at least 1,000 games with a single NHL franchise, as of the conclusion of the 2021–22 NHL season.

Anaheim Ducks

The Ducks' active leader in games played is Cam Fowler, who has played 811 games with the team.

Arizona Coyotes

The Coyotes' active leader in games played is Clayton Keller, who has played 360 games with the team.

Boston Bruins

Buffalo Sabres

The Sabres' active leader in games played is Zemgus Girgensons, who has played 545 games with the team.

Calgary Flames

The Flames' active leader in games played is Mikael Backlund, who has played 826 games with the team.

Carolina Hurricanes

The Hurricanes' active leader in games played is Jordan Staal, who has played 661 games with the team.

Chicago Blackhawks

Colorado Avalanche

The Avalanche's active leader in games played is Gabriel Landeskog, who has played 738 games with the team.

Columbus Blue Jackets
No player has played 1,000 games with the franchise. The Blue Jackets' all-time leader in games played is Rick Nash, who played 674 games with the team. The Blue Jackets' active leader in games played is Boone Jenner, who has played 589 games with the team.

Dallas Stars

The Stars' active leader in games played is Jamie Benn, who has played 948 games with the team.

Detroit Red Wings

The Red Wings' active leader in games played is Danny DeKeyser, who has played 547 games with the team.

Edmonton Oilers

The Oilers' active leader in games played is Ryan Nugent-Hopkins, who has played 719 games with the team.

Florida Panthers
No player has played 1,000 games with the franchise. The Panthers' all-time leader in games played is Jonathan Huberdeau, who played 671 games with the team. The Panthers' active leader in games played is Aleksander Barkov, who has played 596 games with the team.

Los Angeles Kings

Minnesota Wild

The Wild's active leader in games played is Jared Spurgeon, who has played 772 games with the team.

Montreal Canadiens

The Canadiens' active leader in games played is Brendan Gallagher, who has played 638 games with the team.

Nashville Predators
No player has played 1,000 games with the franchise. The Predators' all-time leader in games played is David Legwand, who played 956 games with the team. The Predators' active leader in games played is Roman Josi, who has played 760 games with the team.

New Jersey Devils

The Devils' active leader in games played is Damon Severson, who has played 566 games with the team.

New York Islanders

The Islanders' active leader in games played is Josh Bailey, who has played 993 games with the team.

New York Rangers

The Rangers' active leader in games played is Chris Kreider, who has played 654 games with the team.

Ottawa Senators

The Senators' active leader in games played is Thomas Chabot, who has played 313 games with the team.

Philadelphia Flyers

The Flyers' active leader in games played is Sean Couturier, who has played 721 games with the team.

Pittsburgh Penguins

San Jose Sharks

Seattle Kraken
The Kraken's active and all-time leader in games played is Adam Larsson, who has played 82 games with the team.

St. Louis Blues
No player has played 1,000 games with the franchise. The Blues' current leader in games played is Bernie Federko, who played 927 games with the team. The Blues' active leader in games played is Vladimir Tarasenko, who has played 606 games with the team.

Tampa Bay Lightning

The Lightning's active leader in games played is Steven Stamkos, who has played 922 games with the team.

Toronto Maple Leafs

The Maple Leafs' active leader in games played is Morgan Rielly, who has played 654 games with the team.

Vancouver Canucks

The Canucks' active leader in games played is Bo Horvat, who has played 572 games with the team.

Vegas Golden Knights
The Golden Knights' active and all-time leader in games played is Jonathan Marchessault, who has played 356 games with the team.

Washington Capitals

Winnipeg Jets
No player has played 1,000 games with the franchise. The Jets' all-time leader in games played is Bryan Little, who played 843 games with the team. The Jets' active leader in games played is Blake Wheeler, who has played 825 games with the team. The franchise was originally known as the Atlanta Thrashers from 1999 to 2011.

References

External links
Career games played leaders at Hockey-Reference

National Hockey League statistical records
Lists of National Hockey League players